The Beskydy Tunnel is a railway tunnel of the Lviv Railways under the Volovets Pass in the Carpathian Mountains. As the second-longest tunnel in Ukraine, it is a part of the fifth pan-European transit corridor (Italy-Slovenia-Hungary-Slovakia-Ukraine).

Old tunnel 
In time, the capacity of the tunnel no longer met increasing demand, thus it was decided to make a new bore parallel to the existing tunnel. Discussions began in 1998 and construction started in 2014. The new tunnel has a length of 1,822 meters and is covered by up to 180 meters of rock. The internal dimensions of 8.5 meters height and 10.5 meters width allows for a double track railway to be accommodated. The maximum speed was increased from 40 km/h to 70 km/h. As a result, the tunnel can now handle daily traffic of 50 to 100 trains. The two tubes are connected by three lugs, while the old tunnel is being used as a rescue route for the new one. During late May 2018, the tunnel was inaugurated in a ceremony.

New tunnel 
The new Beskydy tunnel passes through the mountains between the towns of Beskid and Skotarske and connects the Ukrainian rail network with Europe's Corridor V, thus linking the city of Lviv in western Ukraine to cities such as Venice and Trieste in northern Italy, as well as various other locations along the route in Slovenia and Hungary. The new tunnel is expected to handle nearly 60% of all rail traffic travelling between Ukraine and the European Union.

The project was financed by the European Bank for Reconstruction and Development (EBRD) and the European Investment Bank (EIB); the EBRD invested $40 million, while the EIB contributed €55 million ($64.5 million) for construction. The EBRD director for Ukraine Sevki Acuner said: "The new tunnel is a positive example of the contemporary relationship between Ukraine and Europe. It will unblock the worst bottleneck in the east-west transport corridor. More importantly, it symbolises Ukraine's aspiration to be integrated into the EU economy and to become part of the 21st-century European family".

In addition to providing financing, technical expertise was bought in from the EU, especially from Austria, to support the development of the tunnel. The new tunnel was built with the New Austrian Tunneling Method. Breakthrough was achieved in January 2016. The construction process reportedly required 130,000 tonnes of concrete and 8,000 tonnes of steel.

The Beskydy rail tunnel was inaugurated by Ukrainian President Petro Poroshenko in late May 2018. It will reduce journey times between Lviv and Ukrainian border town Chop, in a bid to facilitate exports of domestic products to neighbouring countries.

2022 Russian attack 
On the night of 1-2 June 2022, Russia targeted a section of the tunnel with at least two Kalibr cruise missiles to disrupt weapon and fuel supplies from the West to Ukraine during the 2022 Russian invasion of Ukraine. The attack was confirmed by governor of Lviv Oblast Maksym Kozytskyy.

References

External links
 Beskidy tunnel – from idea to realization (Бескидський тунель - від ідеї до втілення). Lviv Railways on YouTube. (concept video)

Railway tunnels in Ukraine
Rail transport in Zakarpattia Oblast
Rail transport in Lviv Oblast
Tunnels completed in 1886
Tunnels in Zakarpattia Oblast
Tunnels in Lviv Oblast
1886 establishments in Austria-Hungary
Establishments in the Kingdom of Galicia and Lodomeria